The Mutawakkilite Kingdom of Yemen, also known as the Kingdom of Yemen or simply as Yemen, or, retrospectively, as North Yemen, was a state that existed between 1918 and 1962 in the northwestern part of what is now Yemen. Its capital was Sana'a until 1948, then Taiz. From 1962 to 1970, it maintained control over portions of Yemen until its final defeat in the North Yemen Civil War. Yemen was admitted to the United Nations on 30 September 1947.

History

Background

Zaidi religious leaders expelled forces of the Ottoman Empire from what is now northern Yemen by the middle of the 17th century but, within a century, the unity of Yemen was fractured due to the difficulty of governing Yemen's mountainous terrain. 

In 1849, the Ottoman Empire occupied the coastal Tihamah region to put pressure on the Zaiddiyah imam to sign a treaty recognizing Ottoman suzerainty and allowing for a small Ottoman force to be stationed in Sana'a. However, the Ottomans were slow to gain control over Yemen and never managed to eliminate all resistance from local Zaydis. In 1913, shortly before World War I, the Ottoman Empire was forced to formally cede some power to highland Zaydis.

Independence
On 30 October 1918, following the collapse of the Ottoman Empire, Imam Yahya Muhammad of the al-Qasimi dynasty declared northern Yemen an independent sovereign state. In 1926, Yahya proclaimed the Mutawakkilite Kingdom of Yemen, becoming both a temporal king as well as a (Zaydi) spiritual leader, and won international recognition for his new state, such as with the Kingdom of Italy, entering into the Italo-Yemeni Treaty in 1926.

Consolidation
In the 1920s, Yahya expanded his power to the north into Tihamah, but he collided with the rising influence of the Saudi king of Nejd and Hejaz, Abdul Aziz ibn Sa'ud. In the early 1930s, Saudi forces retook much of this territory before withdrawing from parts of the area, including the southern Tihamah city of Al Hudaydah. The present-day boundary with Saudi Arabia was established on 20 May 1934 by the Treaty of Taif, following the Saudi–Yemeni War in 1934. Yahya's non-recognition of his kingdom's southern boundary with the British Aden Protectorate (later the People's Democratic Republic of Yemen) that had been negotiated by his Ottoman predecessors resulted in occasional clashes with the British.

In 1932, the governments of Yemen and the Kingdom of Iraq signed a treaty that led to the training of Yemeni Army officers in Iraq. Later, several of them would play a key role in the 1962 coup d'état in North Yemen.

The Kingdom of Yemen became a founding member of the Arab League in 1945 and joined the United Nations on 30 September 1947. It committed a small expeditionary force to the 1948 Arab–Israeli War.

Instability and decline
Imam Yahya was assassinated in an unsuccessful coup d'état in 1948, but his son, Imam Ahmad bin Yahya, regained power several months later. His reign was marked by growing development and openness, as well as renewed friction with the United Kingdom over the British presence in the south, which stood in the way of his aspirations to create a Greater Yemen. Imam Ahmad was slightly more forward-thinking than his father and was more open to foreign contacts.  Nonetheless, his regime, like his father's, was autocratic and semi-medieval in character; even the most mundane measures required his personal approval.

In March 1955, a coup by a group of officers and two of Ahmad's brothers briefly deposed the king but was quickly suppressed. Ahmad faced growing pressures, supported by the Arab nationalist and pan-Arabist objectives of the President of Egypt, Gamal Abdel Nasser, and, in April 1956, he signed a mutual defense pact with Egypt. In March 1958, Yemen joined the United Arab Republic (a federation of Egypt and Syria formed in February 1958) in a confederation known as the United Arab States. However, this confederation was dissolved in December 1961, soon after Syria withdrew from the United Arab Republic and the United Arab States in September 1961. Relations between Egypt and Yemen subsequently deteriorated.

Imam Ahmad died in September 1962 and was succeeded by his son, Crown Prince Muhammad al-Badr, whose reign was brief. Egyptian-trained military officers inspired by Nasser and led by the commander of the royal guard, Abdullah as-Sallal, deposed him the same year he was crowned, took control of Sana'a, and created the Yemen Arab Republic (YAR). This sparked the North Yemen Civil War and created a new front in the Arab Cold War, in which Egypt assisted the YAR with troops and supplies to combat forces loyal to the imamate, while the monarchies of Saudi Arabia and Jordan supported Badr's royalist forces in opposing the newly formed republic. Conflict continued periodically until 1967 when Egyptian troops were withdrawn. By 1968, following a final royalist siege of Sana'a, most of the opposing leaders had reached a reconciliation, and Saudi Arabia recognized the republic in 1970.

Flags

See also 
 History of Yemen
 Imams of Yemen
 List of Shia dynasties
 United Arab States
 Yemen Arab Republic

References

Sources 
 History of Arabia, Encyclopædia Britannica (Macropædia Vol. 1). Chicago: Encyclopædia Britannica, 1979, pp. 1043–1051.
 Kingdom of Yemen at Flags of the World.

External links

Kingdom of Yemen at nationalanthems.info.

 
 
States and territories established in 1918
States and territories disestablished in 1970
Former countries in the Middle East
Yemeni monarchy
Former monarchies
Former Arab states
Former monarchies of Asia
Shia dynasties
Neutral states in World War II
Former member states of the United Nations